William  Newman  (1811–1864) was the inaugural Dean of Cape Town.

Notes

1811 births
19th-century South African Anglican priests
Deans of Cape Town
1864 deaths